Carvana is an online used car retailer based in Tempe, Arizona. The company is the fastest growing online used car dealer in the United States and is known for its multi-story car vending machines. Carvana was named to the 2021 Fortune 500 list, one of the youngest companies to be added to the list.

History

Carvana was founded Ryan Keeton and Ben Huston in 2012. The company's initial funding round came from the used car retailer and finance company, DriveTime.

In November 2013, Carvana opened its first iteration of a car vending machine. In 2015, a fully automated, commemorative coin-operated version of the signature car vending machine opened in Nashville, Tennessee. , Carvana operates 32 vending machines in the US.

In April 2017, the company went public and began trading on the New York Stock Exchange under the symbol CVNA. Also in 2017 Carvana acquired rival automotive startup Carlypso to enhance vehicle data and analytical tools. In April 2018, Carvana spent $22 million to acquire Mark Cuban-backed Car360 for its smartphone technology for taking vehicle photos with 3D computer vision, machine learning, and augmented reality.

In response to COVID-19, Carvana introduced touchless delivery and pick-up in March 2020. In Q2 of 2020, the company reported a 25% increase in vehicle sales, as a result of physical dealership sellers being closed as a consequence of the COVID-19 pandemic. Carvana had a gross revenue of $1.12 billion, up 13% for the months April–June 2020.

In 2020, Carvana sold 244,111 vehicles and posted annual revenue of $5.587 billion, making it the second largest online used-car retailer in the U.S.

As of August 2021, Carvana's as-soon-as-next day delivery was available in 300+ markets across the country.

During the COVID-19 pandemic, Carvana's market value surged when consumers turned to vehicle online marketplaces.

A May 10, 2022, article in The Wall Street Journal reported that Carvana had to lay off 12 percent of its staff (2,500 employees) after falling short of growth expectations. Carvana stock was 90 percent off its 52-week stock price as interest in the company collapsed.

On November 4, 2022, Carvana's stock price dropped around 40 percent following its poor third-quarter financial results. The total number of used vehicles sold declined by 8 percent to 102,570. Analysts blamed rising borrowing costs and elevated used-car prices.

Legal issues 
In August 2021, Carvana was issued a temporary ban by regulators in North Carolina due to its failure to properly conduct inspections and provide vehicle titles to customers as required by state law. Carvana was allowed to resume business in North Carolina in January 2022.

On May 10, 2022, Illinois indefinitely suspended Carvana's business license due to customer complaints, effectively banning the company from conducting business in the state. The Office of the Secretary of State of Illinois stated that the company had failed to provide titles to buyers for the vehicles they had purchased within 20 days, as required by Illinois law, and in some cases had illegally issued temporary registrations from other states to customers in Illinois. The state lifted the suspension on May 26, 2022, after imposing strict guidelines on the company's operations. On July 18, 2022, the Secretary of State's office announced that Carvana's suspension was reimposed after finding that company continued to engage in illegal conduct. Paul Breaux, Vice President for Carvana, was charged with multiple misdemeanor and petty offenses due to the Illinois issues.

Similar issues have been faced in other states, including Pennsylvania where a class action lawsuit has been filed alleging that the company violated the state's Unfair and Deceptive Trade Practices Act by failing to properly transfer ownership to buyers, a matter in which Carvana denies any liability.

On October 7, 2022, the Michigan Secretary of State suspended the license for the Carvana dealership in Novi for "immediate harm to the public." The state said Carvana committed several alleged violations of the Michigan Vehicle Code. The alleged violations were discovered during an investigation by the state regulatory staff of multiple complaints from consumers about title problems with their vehicles. The violations include:

 Failing to make application for title and registration within 15 days of delivery for 112 customers since agreeing to an earlier probation extension.
 Committing fraud in connection with selling or otherwise dealing in vehicles where Carvana employees admitted to destroying title applications and all applicable documents pertaining to the sale of three vehicles that were sold to customers and Carvana took the vehicles back.
 Failing to maintain odometer records.
 Improperly issuing temporary registrations.
 Failing to have records available for inspection during reasonable or established business hours.
 Possessing improper odometer disclosure records on which the odometer disclosure had been signed on behalf of the car buyer.
 Violating terms of a probation agreement 127 times.

Prior to the October 2022 suspension, the state had conducted an investigation in February 2021 that led to Carvana agreeing to be placed under probation in May 2021 and admitted to violations. During the probation period, additional violations occurred and Carvana agreed to a six-month extension of the probation period in February 2022. Despite the suspension, the Novi location continued to operate the following week.

Sponsorships 
Carvana is a sponsor of the USL Championship's Phoenix Rising Football Club since 2018, and 7-time NASCAR Cup Series championship driver Jimmie Johnson since 2021.

References

External links
 

2017 initial public offerings
Companies listed on the New York Stock Exchange
Automotive websites
Online automotive companies of the United States
Auto dealerships of the United States
American companies established in 2013
Retail companies established in 2013
Internet properties established in 2013
2013 establishments in Arizona
Companies based in Tempe, Arizona
Used car market